Antônio Carlos Aguilar Gouveia (born April 20, 1965), known as Carlão, is a Brazilian former volleyball player who competed in the 1988 Summer Olympics and in the 1992 Summer Olympics.

In 1988, he was part of the Brazilian team which finished fourth in the Olympic tournament. He played all seven matches.

Four years later, in 1992, he won the gold medal with the Brazilian team in the 1992 Olympic tournament. He played all eight matches.

External links
 

1965 births
Living people
Brazilian men's volleyball players
Olympic volleyball players of Brazil
Volleyball players at the 1988 Summer Olympics
Volleyball players at the 1992 Summer Olympics
Olympic gold medalists for Brazil
Olympic medalists in volleyball
Medalists at the 1992 Summer Olympics
People from Rio Branco, Acre
Sportspeople from Acre (state)